The Swimming Center M-86 is a complex of pools in southeast of Madrid, Spain. The headquarters of the Royal Spanish Swimming Federation are located there.

Overview
The official opening was on 14 May 1986. The complex was built to host the 5th World Aquatics Championships held in August 1986. The name of the swimming center is derived from this event (M-86: Madrid 1986). Its area is about 21,000 square meters.

Events
The indoor pool of the M-86 Swimming Center has staged the following events:
 2004 European Aquatics Championships
 2011 Women's European U-17 Junior Championships in Water Polo
 World Championships Qualification Tournament in Water Polo.
 Spanish Aquatics Championships
 FINA Water Polo World League
 Spanish League

Awards
 1986: Gold Medal for the best aquatics facility (awarded by the National Pool in Washington, D.C., United States)
 1989: National Award (awarded by the Sports Quality Association)
 1989: World's largest swimming complex (included in the Guinness Book of World Records)
 Silver Medal, Category A, as a High Level Training Center (awarded by the IAKS - International Association for Sports and Leisure Facilities)

References

External links
Swimming Pool Services
Pool Cleaning & Maintenance

Swimming venues in Spain
Sports venues in Madrid
2011 establishments in Spain
Sports venues completed in 1986
Buildings and structures in Retiro District, Madrid